Plaza on Brickell is an urban development in Miami, Florida, United States. The complex consists of two skyscrapers and a retail center at the base, connecting the two towers. The towers completed construction in late 2007. The Plaza on Brickell Tower I, the taller of the two buildings, rises  and 56 floors. The two towers, although different in height, are twin towers in design. Both are built on land at the corner of Brickell Avenue and Southeast 9th Street, in the northern Brickell Financial District. The architecture of the complex was designed by Nichols Architects, a Coral Gables firm formerly known as NBWW (Nichols Brosch Wurst Wolf & Associates). The Plaza on Brickell is in a great location that is very walker friendly with quick access to The Brickell City Centre, Mary Brickell Village, and Brickell Key.

See also
List of tallest buildings in Miami
 Downtown Miami
 List of tallest buildings in Florida

References

 Plaza on Brickell Complex from Emporis
 Tower I on Emporis
 Tower II on Emporis

Residential buildings completed in 2007
Residential skyscrapers in Miami
2007 establishments in Florida